Pathamadai or Pattamadai is a special grade town panchayath in Tirunelveli district in the Indian state of Tamil Nadu.

Demographics
 India census, Pattamadai had a population of 14,965. Males constitute 49% of the population and females 51%. Pattamadai has an average literacy rate of 72%, higher than the national average of 59.5%: male literacy is 80%, and female literacy is 66%. In Pattamadai, 11% of the population is under age 6.

Mats of Pathamadai
Pathamadai has a mat industry which produces mats crafted out of korai grass (Reed plant) also called as Indian Chattai. They are flexible and have been gifted to leaders like Nikolai Bulganin and Nikita Khrushchev.

Notable people
Sivananda Saraswati, Hindu spiritual teacher and a proponent of Yoga and Vedanta.
Madurai Sundar, Carnatic musician

References

Cities and towns in Tirunelveli district
Hindu holy cities